Mexico participated in the ninth Winter Paralympics in Turin, Italy, entering one athlete.  Mexico was the only nation participating in the Paralympics that did not send a delegation to the Torino Olympics.

Alpine skier Armando Ruiz (LW 11, b. August 27, 1963), a lawyer from Mexico City, competed in the giant slalom, finishing 41st out of 41 finishers in the men's sitting category with a combined two-run adjusted time of 5:43.45, nearly four minutes behind winner Martin Braxenthaler of Germany and nearly three minutes behind 40th-place finisher Xavier Barios of Andorra.  It was the first ski race he had ever competed in, and he received a huge ovation from the crowd after completing each run.

Ruiz was one of the 3 men finalists for the Whang Youn Dai Overcome Prize of the Paralympic Games.

See also
2006 Winter Paralympics
Mexico at the 2006 Winter Olympics

External links
Torino 2006 Paralympic Games
International Paralympic Committee

2006
Nations at the 2006 Winter Paralympics
Winter Paralympics